Bobovište (Montenegrin and ) is a village in Bar Municipality, in southeastern Montenegro. It lies on the western bank of Lake Skadar, in a geographical region known as Skadarska Krajina. It is inhabited by ethnic Albanians.

History
Prior to the village population's conversion to Islam, they had used the nearby Orthodox Moračnik Monastery as their church. In 1894, while Branislav Nušić travelled here, he noted that the village was Muslim.

Demographics
As of 2003 the village had a population of 230.

According to the 2011 census, its population was 180.
All of the inhabitants are Sunni Muslim and Albanian. The average age of the population is 43.1. A major fallout in the population has been due to young people emigrating to western countries such as USA, Switzerland and Australia etc. A large majority of people from Bobosht emigrated to especially USA

References

Populated places in Bar Municipality
Albanian communities in Montenegro